Aldwyn Sappleton (born 21 December 1981, in Saint Ann Parish) is a Jamaican track and field athlete, who specialized in middle distance running. He won three medals, including gold in the 1500 metres, at the 1999 CARIFTA Games in Fort-de-France, Martinique. He is also a four-time All-American track and field athlete, while playing for the Oklahoma Sooners, at the University of Oklahoma in Norman.

Sappleton represented Jamaica at the 2008 Summer Olympics in Beijing, and competed in the men's 800 metres. He ran in the seventh heat of the event, against seven other competitors, including Netherlands' Robert Lathouwers, and Andrew Wheating of the United States. Sappleton finished the race in sixth place, with a time of 1:48.19, failing to advance into the semi-final rounds.

References

External links
 

NBC Olympics Profile
 

1981 births
Living people
Jamaican male middle-distance runners
Olympic athletes of Jamaica
Athletes (track and field) at the 2008 Summer Olympics
People from Saint Ann Parish
World Athletics Indoor Championships medalists
Central American and Caribbean Games medalists in athletics